Jaonli is a 6,632-metre peak in the Gangotri range of Garhwal Himalaya. It was first climbed in 1965 by The Doon School expedition team led by Hari Dang.

See also
Role of The Doon School in Indian mountaineering

References

Mountains of Uttarakhand
Geography of Uttarkashi district
Six-thousanders of the Himalayas